Jehonville Air Base  is a NATO reserve airfield located in Jehonville, a municipality in Bertrix, Belgium. It is operated by the Belgian Air Component even though there are no regular operations at that field.

See also 
 List of airports in Belgium

References

External links 
 Airfield overview

Belgian airbases
Airports in Luxembourg (Belgium)
Bertrix